This is a list of academic journals published by the American Society of Civil Engineers.

List

External links
List on ASCE website

American Society of Civil Engineers
Civil engineering journals